Green is a city in Clay County, Kansas, United States.  As of the 2020 census, the population of the city was 95.

History
A post office was opened in Powellsburgh (an extinct town) in 1872, but it was moved to Green in 1881.

Green was incorporated in 1908. It is named in honor of the fourth Governor of Kansas, Nehemiah Green, who offered to donate a church bell to the town in exchange for the naming rights.

Green was a shipping point on the Union Pacific Railroad.

Geography
Green is located at  (39.430247, -96.999195).

Demographics

2010 census
As of the census of 2010, there were 128 people, 54 households, and 34 families residing in the city. The racial makeup of the city was 97.7% White, 1.6% Native American, and 0.8% from two or more races. Hispanic or Latino people of any race were 2.3% of the population.

There were 54 households, of which 31.5% had children under the age of 18 living with them, 48.1% were married couples living together, 7.4% had a female householder with no husband present, 7.4% had a male householder with no wife present, and 37.0% were non-families. 31.5% of all households were made up of individuals, and 16.7% had someone living alone who was 65 years of age or older. The average household size was 2.37 and the average family size was 3.03.

The median age in the city was 36.6 years. 28.1% of residents were under the age of 18; 3% were between the ages of 18 and 24; 29% were from 25 to 44; 27.3% were from 45 to 64; and 12.5% were 65 years of age or older. The gender makeup of the city was 50.0% male and 50.0% female.

2000 census
As of the census of 2000, there were 147 people, 58 households, and 41 families residing in the city. The racial makeup of the city was 96.60% White, 0.68% African American and 2.72% Native American. Hispanic or Latino people of any race were 1.36% of the population.

There were 58 households, out of which 41.4% had children under the age of 18 living with them, 50.0% were married couples living together, 13.8% had a female householder with no husband present, and 29.3% were non-families. 24.1% of all households were made up of individuals, and 10.3% had someone living alone who was 65 years of age or older. The average household size was 2.53 and the average family size was 3.05.

In the city, the population was spread out, with 34.0% under the age of 18, 8.2% from 18 to 24, 29.3% from 25 to 44, 19.0% from 45 to 64, and 9.5% who were 65 years of age or older. The median age was 30 years. For every 100 females, there were 96.0 males. For every 100 females age 18 and over, there were 98.0 males.

The median income for a household in the city was $27,083, and the median income for a family was $29,167. Males had a median income of $21,750 versus $27,500 for females. The per capita income for the city was $11,171. 5.3% of families and 4.4% of the population were living below the poverty line, including 5.6% of those under eighteen and none of those over 64.

Education
The community is served by Clay County USD 379 public school district.

Gallery

References

Further reading

External links
 Green - Directory of Public Officials
 Clay County Mural Map
 Green city map, KDOT

Cities in Kansas
Cities in Clay County, Kansas